Geoffrey Ursell (March 14, 1943 – February 21, 2021) was a Canadian writer, who won the Books in Canada First Novel Award in 1985 for his novel Perdue, or How the West Was Lost.

Career

Predominantly known as a playwright, Ursell's stage and musical plays have included The Running of the Deer (1981), Saskatoon Pie (1982), The Willowbunch Giant (1983), The Secret Life of Railroaders (1986), The Rum Runners of Rainbow Ravine (1990), The Park (1994), Deer Bring the Sun (1998), Gold on Ice (2003), Winning the Prairie Gamble (2005), The Walnut Tree (2010) and Dead Midnight (2011). He has also adapted The Rum Runners of Rainbow Ravine as a CBC Radio drama, and wrote the teleplay Distant Battles for CBC Television.

With his wife Barbara Sapergia and colleagues Bob Currie and Gary Hyland, Ursell was a cofounder of Coteau Books in the 1970s. In 1987, Ursell and Sapergia pitched a series to CBC Television called Midnight in Moose Jaw, a sitcom-variety hybrid set in a Prohibition-era speakeasy which would centre around live performances by real comedians and musicians, with Jenny Jones and Colin James as the guest performers in the pilot. The series was not picked up by the CBC.

His other published books have included the poetry collections Trap Lines (1982), The Look-Out Tower (1989) and Jumbo Gumbo: Songs, Poems, and Stories for Children (1990), and the short story collection Way Out West (1990).

He has served as president of the Saskatchewan Writers' Guild and the Saskatchewan Playwrights' Centre, has been writer-in-residence for the Saskatoon Public Library and the Winnipeg Public Library, was an editor of the literary magazine Grain, and has taught literature and creative writing at the University of Regina.

References

1943 births
2021 deaths
20th-century Canadian novelists
20th-century Canadian dramatists and playwrights
20th-century Canadian poets
Canadian male poets
21st-century Canadian dramatists and playwrights
Canadian musical theatre composers
Canadian male novelists
Canadian male short story writers
Canadian radio writers
Canadian television writers
Canadian children's writers
Writers from Saskatchewan
People from Moose Jaw
Canadian book publishers (people)
Canadian magazine editors
Academic staff of the University of Regina
Canadian male screenwriters
Canadian male dramatists and playwrights
20th-century Canadian short story writers
21st-century Canadian short story writers
20th-century Canadian male writers
21st-century Canadian male writers
20th-century Canadian screenwriters
Canadian male television writers
Amazon.ca First Novel Award winners